is a railway station on the Takayama Main Line in the town of Kawabe, Kamo District, Gifu Prefecture, Japan, operated by Central Japan Railway Company (JR Central).

Lines

Station layout
Shimoasō Station has one ground-level island platform and one ground level side platform connected by a footbridge. The station is unattended.

Platforms

Adjacent stations

History
Shimoasō Station opened on November 25, 1922. The station was absorbed into the JR Central network upon the privatization of Japanese National Railways (JNR) on April 1, 1987.

Surrounding area
 Kawabe Kita Elementary School
 Hida River

See also
 List of Railway Stations in Japan

References

Railway stations in Gifu Prefecture
Takayama Main Line
Railway stations in Japan opened in 1922
Stations of Central Japan Railway Company
Kawabe, Gifu